Mamadou Lamarana Diallo (born 23 August 1985) is a Guinean-born Indonesian former footballer who last played as a forward for Liga 3 club Persiku Kudus.

Career

PSMS Medan
He was signed for PSMS Medan to play in Liga 2 in the 2019 season. Diallo played 1 time without scoring a goal.

Persatu Tuban
In middle season 2019, Lamarana Diallo signed a year contract with Persatu Tuban from PSMS Medan. He made 10 league appearances and scored 5 goals for Persatu Tuban.

Persiku Kudus
He was signed for Persiku Kudus to play in Liga 3 in the 2021 season. Diallo made 1 league appearance and without scoring a goal for Persiku.

References

External links
 Player profil at goal.com
 Player profil at ligaindonesiabaru.com

1985 births
Living people
Guinean footballers
PSM Makassar players
PSS Sleman players
Persibat Batang players
Persih Tembilahan players
Perseru Serui players
PSMS Medan players
Persela Lamongan players
Badak Lampung F.C. players
Liga 1 (Indonesia) players
Liga 2 (Indonesia) players
Association football forwards
Naturalised citizens of Indonesia
Indonesian people of Guinean descent